Ziprasidone, sold under the brand name Geodon among others, is an atypical antipsychotic used to treat schizophrenia and bipolar disorder. It may be used by mouth and by injection into a muscle (IM). The IM form may be used for acute agitation in people with schizophrenia.

Common side effects include dizziness, drowsiness, dry mouth, and twitches. Although it can also cause weight gain, the risk is much lower than for other atypical antipsychotics. How it works is not entirely clear but is believed to involve effects on serotonin and dopamine in the brain.

Ziprasidone was approved for medical use in the United States in 2001. The pills are made up of the hydrochloride salt, ziprasidone hydrochloride. The intramuscular form is the mesylate, ziprasidone mesylate trihydrate, and is provided as a lyophilized powder. In 2020, it was the 282nd most commonly prescribed medication in the United States, with more than 1million prescriptions.

Medical uses
Ziprasidone is approved by the U.S. Food and Drug Administration (FDA) for the treatment of schizophrenia as well as acute mania and mixed states associated with bipolar disorder. Its intramuscular injection form is approved for acute agitation in schizophrenic patients for whom treatment with just ziprasidone is appropriate.

In a 2013 study in a comparison of 15 antipsychotic drugs in effectiveness in treating schizophrenic symptoms, ziprasidone demonstrated mild-standard effectiveness. 15% more effective than lurasidone and iloperidone, approximately as effective as chlorpromazine and asenapine, and 9–13% less effective than haloperidol, quetiapine, and aripiprazole. Ziprasidone is effective in the treatment of schizophrenia, though evidence from the CATIE trials suggests it is less effective than olanzapine, and equally as effective compared to quetiapine. There are higher discontinuation rates for lower doses of ziprasidone, which are also less effective than higher doses.

Adverse effects
Ziprasidone (and all other second generation antipsychotics (SGAs)) received a black box warning due to increased mortality in elderly patients with dementia-related psychosis.

Sleepiness and headache are very common adverse effects (>10%).

Common adverse effects (1–10%), include producing too much saliva or having dry mouth, runny nose, respiratory disorders or coughing, nausea and vomiting, stomach aches, constipation or diarrhea, loss of appetite, weight gain (but the smallest risk for weight gain compared to other antipsychotics), rashes, fast heart beats, blood pressure falling when standing up quickly, muscle pain, weakness, twitches, dizziness, and anxiety. Extrapyramidal symptoms are also common and include tremor, dystonia (sustained or repetitive muscle contractions), akathisia (the feeling of a need to be in motion), parkinsonism, and muscle rigidity; in a 2013 meta-analysis of 15 antipsychotic drugs, ziprasidone ranked 8th for such side effects.

Ziprasidone is known to trigger mania in some bipolar patients.

This medication can cause birth defects, according to animal studies, although this side effect has not been confirmed in humans.

Recently, the FDA required the manufacturers of some atypical antipsychotics to include a warning about the risk of hyperglycemia and Type II diabetes with atypical antipsychotics. Some evidence suggests that ziprasidone does not cause insulin resistance to the degree of other atypical antipsychotics, such as olanzapine. Weight gain is also less of a concern with ziprasidone compared to other atypical antipsychotics. In fact, in a trial of long term therapy with ziprasidone, overweight patients (BMI > 27) actually had a mean weight loss overall. According to the manufacturer insert, ziprasidone caused an average weight gain of 2.2 kg (4.8 lbs), which is significantly lower than other atypical antipsychotics, making this medication better for patients that are concerned about their weight.
In December 2014, the FDA warned that ziprasidone could cause a potentially fatal skin reaction, Drug Reaction with Eosinophilia and Systemic Symptoms, although this was believed to occur only rarely.

Discontinuation
The British National Formulary recommends a gradual withdrawal when discontinuing antipsychotics to avoid acute withdrawal syndrome or rapid relapse. Symptoms of withdrawal commonly include nausea, vomiting, and loss of appetite. Other symptoms may include restlessness, increased sweating, and trouble sleeping. Less commonly there may be a feeling of the world spinning, numbness, or muscle pains. Symptoms generally resolve after a short period of time.

There is tentative evidence that discontinuation of antipsychotics can result in psychosis. It may also result in reoccurrence of the condition that is being treated. Rarely tardive dyskinesia can occur when the medication is stopped.

Pharmacology

Pharmacodynamics

Correspondence to clinical effects

Ziprasidone mostly affects the receptors of dopamine (D2), serotonin (5-HT2A, partially 5-HT1A, 5-HT2C, and 5-HT1D) and epinephrine/norepinephrine (α1) to a high degree, while of histamine (H1) - moderately. It also somewhat inhibits reuptake of serotonin and norepinephrine, though not dopamine.

Ziprasidone's efficacy in treating the positive symptoms of schizophrenia is believed to be mediated primarily via antagonism of the dopamine receptors, specifically D2. Blockade of the 5-HT2A receptor may also play a role in its effectiveness against positive symptoms, though the significance of this property in antipsychotic drugs is still debated among researchers. Blockade of 5-HT2A and 5-HT2C and activation of 5-HT1A as well as inhibition of the reuptake of serotonin and norepinephrine may all contribute to its ability to alleviate negative symptoms.; however, it's effects on the 5-HT1A receptor may be limited as a study found ziprasidone would likely "produce detectable occupancy [of 5-HT1A receptors] only at higher doses that would produce unacceptable levels of side effects in man, although lower doses are sufficient to produce pharmacological effects." The relatively weak antagonistic actions of ziprasidone on the α1-adrenergic receptor likely in part explains some of its side effects, such as orthostatic hypotension. Unlike many other antipsychotics, ziprasidone has no significant affinity for the mACh receptors, and as such lacks any anticholinergic side effects. Like most other antipsychotics, ziprasidone is sedating due primarily to serotonin and dopamine blockade.

First, it must be setted a disclaimer that this may work just theoretically and caution is advised taking serotonergic substances like mdma together with other serotonergic substances. So ziprasidone, with its very strong 5ht2a bindings, its moderate supressing of other serotonergic pathways by acting as a partial agonist and its weak ability to block Sert and Net transporters, somewhat possesses a complementary receptorprofile to mdma being a candidate for an antidot. This is because it can block Sert and Net transporters acting in reversal through mdma initializing activity inside a neuron reducing the neuronal release to some extend (this only makes sense with mdma dominating the transporter and with a relatively weak blocker, amisulpride serving in this regard). Also through its inactivation of the 5ht2a receptor and its partial supression of other serotonin receptor subtypes acting as an antagonist/partial agonist it can compete with mdmas agonist activity, as both, antagonists and partial agonists reduce binding.

Pharmacokinetics
The systemic bioavailability of ziprasidone is 100% when administered intramuscularly and 60% when administered orally without food.

After a single dose intramuscular administration, the peak serum concentration typically occurs at about 60 minutes after the dose is administered, or earlier. Steady state plasma concentrations are achieved within one to three days. Exposure increases in a dose-related manner and following three days of intramuscular dosing, little accumulation is observed.

The bioavailability of the drug is reduced by approximately 50% if a meal is not eaten before Ziprasidone ingestion.

Ziprasidone is hepatically metabolized by aldehyde oxidase; minor metabolism occurs via cytochrome P450 3A4 (CYP3A4). Medications that induce (e.g. carbamazepine) or inhibit (e.g. ketoconazole) CYP3A4 have been shown to decrease and increase, respectively, blood levels of ziprasidone.

Its biological half-life time is 10 hours at doses of 80–120 milligrams.

History

Ziprasidone is chemically similar to risperidone, of which it is a structural analogue. 
It was first synthesized in 1987 at the Pfizer central research campus in Groton, Connecticut.

Phase I trials started in 1995. In 1998 ziprasidone was approved in Sweden. After the FDA raised concerns about long QT syndrome, more clinical trials were conducted and submitted to the FDA, which approved the drug on February 5, 2001.

Society and culture

Lawsuit
In September 2009, the U.S. Justice Department announced that Pfizer had been ordered to pay a historic fine of $2.3 billion as a penalty for fraudulent marketing of several drugs, including Geodon. Pfizer had illegally promoted Geodon and submitted false claims to government health care programs for uses that were not medically accepted indications. The civil settlement also resolves allegations that Pfizer paid kickbacks to health care providers to induce them to prescribe Geodon, as well as other drugs. This was the largest civil fraud settlement in history against a pharmaceutical company.

References

Further reading 
 

Atypical antipsychotics
Benzoisothiazoles
Dopamine antagonists
Mood stabilizers
Pfizer brands
Piperazines
Serotonin receptor antagonists
Oxindoles
Chloroarenes
Substances discovered in the 1980s